Sally Boyden may refer to:
Sally Boyden (singer) (born 1965), Australian singer and actor
Sally Boyden (cyclist) (born 1967), British track and road racing cyclist